Rap1 GTPase-GDP dissociation stimulator 1 is an enzyme that in humans is encoded by the RAP1GDS1 gene.

Interactions
RAP1GDS1 has been shown to interact with KIFAP3, HRAS and RHOA.

References

Further reading

Armadillo-repeat-containing proteins